István Szijjártó ( – 10 September 1833) was a Slovene Lutheran teacher and poet in Hungary.

He was born in Večeslavci (Prekmurje), near the Styrian border. His father was Iván Szijjártó, a Slovene peasant.  Szijjártó studied in Nemescsó and in Sopron, at the Lutheran lyceum (?–1783). He taught in Križevci from 1787 to 1806 in Puconci. He later worked in Domanjševci, where he died.

In 1796, his hymnal Mrtvecsne Peszmi (Dirges) was published.

Works
 Mrtvecsne Peszmi (Dirges), 1796
 Molitvi na sztári szlovenszki jezik obrnyene (Prayers Translated into Old Slovene), 1797
 Sztarisinsztvo, i zvacsinsztvo (Marriage and Wedding), 1807
 Sztarisinsztvo i zvacsinsztvo, 1852

See also
 List of Slovene writers and poets in Hungary

References

 Anton Trstenjak: Slovenci na Ogrskem, Narodnapisna in književna črtica, Objava arhivskih virov Maribor 2006. 

1765 births
1833 deaths
People from the Municipality of Rogašovci
Slovenian Lutherans
Slovenian writers and poets in Hungary
Hungarian educators
People from the Municipality of Gornji Petrovci